Walter Hugh Clark (December 4, 1929 – April 27, 2017) was an American politician. He served as a member of the South Carolina House of Representatives.

Life and career 
Clark attended Johnston High School.

In 1961, Clark was elected to the South Carolina House of Representatives, representing Edgefield County, South Carolina.

Clark died in April 2017, at the age of 87.

References 

1929 births
2017 deaths
Members of the South Carolina House of Representatives
20th-century American politicians